Siv is a Scandinavian feminine given name found chiefly in Denmark, Sweden, and Norway. The name derives from the Old Norse word for "bride". In Norse mythology Sif/Siv was the wife of Thor. Individuals bearing the name Siv include:

Siv Bråten Lunde (born 1960), Norwegian biathlete 
Siv Cedering (1939–2007). Swedish-American poet, writer, and artist
Siv Ericks (1918–2005), Swedish actress
Siv Elin Hansen (born 1974), Norwegian politician
Siv Friðleifsdóttir (born 1962), Icelandic politician
Siv Gustavsson (born 1957), Swedish racewalking athlete
Siv Heim Sæbøe (born 1973), Norwegian team handball player
Siv Holma (1952–2016), Swedish politician
Siv Henriette Jacobsen (born 1966), Norwegian politician
Siv Jensen (born 1969), Norwegian politician
Siv Mossleth (born 1967), Norwegian politician
Siv Pettersson (1955–1975), Swedish singer
Siv Stubsveen (born 1968), Norwegian media personality
Siv Tørudbakken (born 1968), Norwegian politician
Siv Widerberg (born 1931), Swedish writer and journalist

References

Feminine given names
Scandinavian feminine given names
Danish feminine given names
Norwegian feminine given names
Swedish feminine given names